Justice Williams may refer to:

 Ben T. Williams, associate justice of the Oklahoma Supreme Court
 Charles K. Williams, chief justice of the Vermont Supreme Court
 Elias Hewitt Williams, associate justice of the Iowa Supreme Court
 F. A. Williams, associate justice of the Texas Supreme Court
 Frank J. Williams, chief justice of the Supreme Court of Rhode Island
 Fred Lincoln Williams, associate justice of the Supreme Court of Missouri
 G. Mennen Williams, associate justice and chief justice of the Michigan Supreme Court 
 George Henry Williams, chief justice of the Oregon Supreme Court
 Harold P. Williams, associate justice of the Massachusetts Supreme Judicial Court
 Hugh Williams (judge), judge of the High Court of New Zealand 
 John Williams (archbishop of York), Lord High Chancellor of England
 Joseph Williams (justice), chief justice of the Iowa Supreme Court
 Joshua Williams (1837–1915), New Zealand lawyer, politician, Supreme Court judge and university chancellor
 L. Judson Williams, associate justice of the Supreme Court of Appeals of West Virginia
 Marshall Jay Williams, associate justice of the Ohio Supreme Court
 Robert L. Williams, chief justice of Oklahoma
 Roy Hughes Williams, associate justice of the Ohio Supreme Court
 Samuel Cole Williams, associate justice of the Tennessee Supreme Court
 Thomas L. Williams (judge), associate justice of the Tennessee Supreme Court
 Thomas Scott Williams, chief justice of the Connecticut Supreme Court
 William Muir Williams, associate justice of the Supreme Court of Missouri

See also
Judge Williams (disambiguation)